Wadi Shah (also known as Wadi Shehah) is a wadi, or waterway, in the mountains of Ras Al Khaimah, United Arab Emirates (UAE). A popular hiking location near to Jebel Jais, the highest point in the UAE, Wadi Shah is also the location of the abandoned former settlement of Shah.

References 

Populated places in the Emirate of Ras Al Khaimah